Olivier Dollfus (12 February 1931 – 1 February 2005) was a French geographer.

1931 births
2005 deaths
French geographers
International relations scholars
Scientists from Paris
20th-century geographers